Actinidiolide is a cat attractant.

References

Cat attractants
Lactones
Iridoids